Quimperiidae is a family of nematodes belonging to the order Rhabditida.

Genera

Genera:
 Buckleynema Ali & Singh, 1954
 Desmognathinema Baker, Goater & Esch, 1987
 Ezonema Boyce, 1971

References

Nematodes